Howl is the third studio album by British electronic musician Ryan Lee West, performed under his stage name Rival Consoles. It was released on 16 October 2015, by Erased Tapes Records.

Critical reception
Howl was met with "generally favorable" reviews from critics. At Metacritic, which assigns a weighted average rating out of 100 to reviews from mainstream publications, this release received an average score of 80 based on 9 reviews. Aggregator Album of the Year gave the release a 75 out of 100 based on a critical consensus of 12 reviews.

Daryl Keating of Exclaim! wrote: "Howl is a well-crafted structure, built on the foundation laid by its predecessors. It's certainly the pinnacle of West's career so far, and up there for electronic album highlight of year." He also explained: "Every note, beat and chord progression is chosen carefully and played with purpose in order to draw genuine feeling out of these cold electronics. The result is a vast, thoughtful record that leaves a deep impression in its wake Reef Younis of Loud and Quiet explained: "Textural and tempered, it's a third album that has more in common with Jon Hopkins and James Holden's droning electronica but there's still plenty in play for 'Howl' to stand in the exalted ambient company of Erased Tapes labelmates like Nils Frahm and Ólafur Arnalds."

Accolades

Track listing

Personnel

Musicians
 Ryan Lee West – primary artist, producer
 Peter Gregson – cello
 Fabian Prynn – drums

Production
 Naweed – mastering

References

2015 albums
Erased Tapes Records albums